Rockets Red Glare was a Canadian alternative rock band from Toronto, active in the early 2000s.

Rockets Red Glare formed in the winter of 1999 following the demise of hardcore band Blake and instrumental trio Blue Light Blockade. They released their self-titled debut album in 2002.

The band's second album, Moonlight Desires, was released in 2003. The album appeared on the !earshot National Top 50 chart in August 2003. That year Rockets Red Glare disbanded; members went on to join Sea Snakes (Strachan), Burn Rome in a Dream (Clarke), Jim Guthrie (Clarke), and Picastro (Clarke). In late 2004 Strachan and drummer David "Gus" Weinkauf formed Feuermusik, a free jazz duo with Strachan on saxophone and Weinkauf playing percussion on buckets.

In 2006 the band reunited to play a series of shows.

Discography 
 "Redshift" / "Halifax" (2001, single) on Die Venom Records
 Rockets Red Glare (2002) on Sickroom Records
 Moonlight Desires (2003) on Blue Skies Turn Black Records

References

Musical groups established in 1999
Musical groups disestablished in 2003
Musical groups from Toronto
Canadian alternative rock groups
1999 establishments in Ontario
2003 disestablishments in Ontario